The 1922-23 Bethlehem Steel F.C. season was the second season for the club in the American Soccer League but its first season in Bethlehem after playing the previous season as Philadelphia F.C. Following the 1921-22 season, the Philadelphia club was transferred "back" to Bethlehem and a new team was organized in Philadelphia to take its place. The club finished the season in 2nd place.

American Soccer League

Pld = Matches played; W = Matches won; D = Matches drawn; L = Matches lost; GF = Goals for; GA = Goals against; Pts = Points

National Challenge Cup

American Cup

Notes and references
Bibliography

Footnotes

Bethlehem Steel F.C.
American Soccer League (1921–1933) seasons
Bethlehem Steel F.C.